Carl Jacobson (born July 27, 1969) was an American businessman and politician.

Jacobson was born in Hibbing, Saint Louis County, Minnesota. He received his bachelor's degree in accounting from Minnesota State University, Mankato. Jacobson lived with his wife and family in Vadnais Heights, Minnesota and was a public accountant. He served in the Minnesota House of Representatives from 2001 to 2004 and was a Republican.

References

1969 births
Living people
People from Hibbing, Minnesota
People from Vadnais Heights, Minnesota
Minnesota State University, Mankato alumni
Businesspeople from Minnesota
Republican Party members of the Minnesota House of Representatives